Plagiostoma is the genus name for two groups of organisms and may refer to:

Plagiostoma (bivalve), a genus of bivalves in the family Limidae
Plagiostoma (fungus), a genus of fungi in the family Gnomoniaceae